Staromarivka, originally Mariental until 2 June 1945, is a village in Volnovakha (district) in Donetsk Oblast of eastern Ukraine.

Demographics

Native language as of the Ukrainian Census of 2001:
 Ukrainian 37.38%
 Russian 61.97%
 Greek 0.66%

References

Villages in Volnovakha Raion